Sandin Wilson (born October 6, 1959 in Medford, Oregon) is a veteran bassist and vocalist from the Pacific Northwest.  As a youth, Sandin played football, baseball, and was involved in music early on, convinced by his Mom, "it will be good for you".

Orchestra was Sandin's first calling on the acoustic bass violin, with a trip to NYC with "America's Youth in Concert" in 1976, at age 16, to play Carnegie Hall, and 9 European Countries.

Sandin picked up the electric and fretless bass as a 9th grader, and took his musical journey a bit further.

A year attending Mt. Hood Community College was next after graduating from Medford Sr. High in 1978.  Sandin went on to perform with the groups, Freeway, Calvin Walker band, The 3 Humans, Caryl Mack band, Quarterflash, Nu Shooz, Soul vaccination, Linda Hornbuckle, and METRO. In 2003, Sandin released his first solo CD, Into My World (Microfish Music), with bassist Jimmy Haslip, of the "Yellowjackets" fame, getting Executive producer credits and Haslip contributing 2 tracks from his songwriting portfolio.

Sandin's second solo project was recorded live to 2-track in October 2006 at Jimmy Maks Jazz club in Portland, Oregon. Entitled, "Sandin Wilson Group", a "Night on the Town" (2007, Microfish Music), it is a very live recording featuring stellar bass and vocal performances from Sandin and his 6 piece group.

Aside from his solo projects, the "Sandin Wilson Group" and Sandin Wilson Trio, he also tours with vocalist/songwriter Gino Vannelli. Sandin has recorded two DVDs with Gino Vannelli's band, one on the Orange lounge.com site and also  a Live DVD while performing at the Java Jazz festival in Jakarta, Indonesia.

Sandin has recorded on over 120 CDs to date and has recorded (on the album Girl In the Wind) and toured with the band Quarterflash, Nu Shooz and opened shows for people such as Kenny Loggins, Chaka Khan, Tower of Power, The Nevell Brothers and Level 42. Sandin's most recent gigs with Gino Vannelli have been in Jakarta, at the "Java Jazz Festival", in Indonesia, "Cape Town South Africa Jazz Festival", and the Suncoast Casino in Las Vegas, Nevada.

External links
 Sandin Wilson's official website

1959 births
Living people
North Medford High School alumni
20th-century American bass guitarists